Fusus brevis is a species of sea snail, a marine gastropod mollusk in the family Fasciolariidae, the spindle snails, the tulip snails and their allies.

Fusus brevis is a nomen dubium

Description

Distribution

References

brevis
Gastropods described in 1827